The following is a list of the European Film Award winners for Lifetime Achievement:

Winners

References

External links
European Film Academy archive

Lifetime Achievement
Lifetime achievement awards
1988 establishments in Europe